Choqa Kabud-e Sofla (also Romanized as Choqā Kabūd-e Soflá; also known as Choqā Kabūd) is a village in Sanjabi Rural District, Kuzaran District, Kermanshah County, Kermanshah Province, Iran. At the 2006 census, its population was 86, in 20 families.

References 

Populated places in Kermanshah County